Pay Dirt is a 1916 American silent drama film directed by Henry King and starring himself, Marguerite Nichols, Gordon Sackville, Mollie McConnell, Daniel Gilfether, and Charles Dudley. The film was released by General Film Company on June 18, 1916.

Plot

Cast
Henry King as The Easterner
Marguerite Nichols as Kate Gardner
Gordon Sackville as Peter Gardner
Mollie McConnell as Moll
Daniel Gilfether as Dick Weed
Charles Dudley as Oby
Philo McCullough as Turner
Ruth White as Doris Wendell
Bruce Smith as Doris's Father

Preservation
A print of the film survives at the Library of Congress.

References

External links

1916 drama films
Silent American drama films
1916 films
American silent feature films
American black-and-white films
Films directed by Henry King
1910s English-language films
1910s American films